Urosalpinx kirbyi is an extinct species of sea snail, a marine gastropod mollusk in the family Muricidae, the murex snails or rock snails.

Description

Distribution
Fossils were found in Eocene strata in California, USA (age range:48.6 to 37.2 Ma).

References

External links
 B. L. Clark. 1938. Fauna from the Markley Formation (Upper Eocene) on Pleasant Creek, California . Bulletin of the Geological Society of America 49:683-730 

kirbyi
Gastropods described in 1938